Novaya Zhizn is a rural locality (a settlement) and the administrative center of Novozhiznenskoye Rural Settlement, Anninsky District, Voronezh Oblast, Russia. The population was 555 as of 2010. There are 9 streets.

Geography 
Novaya Zhizn is located 28 km southeast of Anna (the district's administrative centre) by road. Khleborodnoye is the nearest rural locality.

References 

Rural localities in Anninsky District